Clibadium harlingii is a species of flowering plant in the family Asteraceae. It is found only in Ecuador. Its natural habitat is subtropical or tropical moist montane forests. It is threatened by habitat loss.

References

harlingii
Endemic flora of Ecuador
Vulnerable flora of South America
Taxonomy articles created by Polbot